Henning Astrup (6 June 1864 – 7 December 1896) was a Norwegian architect.

He was born in Kristiania (now Oslo, Norway) to city captain (stadshauptmann) Harald Astrup and Johanne Emilie Smith. He was a brother of Arctic explorer Eivind Astrup (1871–1895), merchant Sigurd Astrup (1873–1949), and architect Thorvald Astrup (1876–1940). His sister Hanna (1869–1933) was married to politician Peter Andreas Morell.

Astrup graduated from the Königliche Technische Hochschule in Berlin. He cooperated professionally with architect Henrik Nissen, and among their designs were Speilsalen of the Grand Hotel in Oslo the Calmeyer Street Mission House from 1891, and Frimurerlogens stamhus (Lodge of the Freemasons) from 1894.

Gallery

References

1864 births
1896 deaths
Architects from Oslo
Technical University of Berlin alumni
Burials at the Cemetery of Our Saviour